Bohdalín is a municipality and village in Pelhřimov District in the Vysočina Region of the Czech Republic. It has about 200 inhabitants.

Gallery

References

Villages in Pelhřimov District